Riazabad railway station (Urdu and ) is located in Riazabad village, Multan district of Punjab province, Pakistan.

See also
 List of railway stations in Pakistan
 Pakistan Railways

References

External links

Railway stations in Multan District
Railway stations on Karachi–Peshawar Line (ML 1)